The battle of Schosshalde was fought between the imperial city of Bern and the House of Habsburg on 27 April 1289 just outside Bern (between Bern and Ostermundigen).

The background of the conflict is Bern's refusal to pay taxes to Habsburg, and turning to the anti-Habsburg alliance of Burgundy and Savoy for protection. Burgundy declared war on Habsburg in 1287, and Rudolf of Habsburg treated Bern as a Burgundian city, laying siege to it twice without success.
The son of Rudolf of Habsubrg, duke Rudolf of Swabia moved towards Bern with 300 cavalry in April 1289 and prepared an ambush outside of the city while harassing the landscape in an attempt to draw out a sortie. 
The plan worked, and the Bernese were surrounded and defeated outside the gates of their city.
Count Louis I of Homberg, a cousin of duke Rudolf, fought on the side of the Bernese and fell, to the consternation of the duke.

In the following negotiations, Bern was forced to again accept taxes and reparation payments, but it retained its imperial immediacy and did not fall to the House of Habsburg.
Within Bern, the defeat led to a political crisis, resulting in a constitution that gave more rights to the craftsmen's guilds.

Medieval Switzerland
History of Bern
1289 in Europe
Schosshalde
Conflicts in 1289